Secrets of Summer is an Argentinian musical streaming television series created by Jorge Edelstein, directed by Mauro Scandolari, produced by Non Stop and released by Netflix. The series stars Pilar Pascual along with Abril Di Yorio, Víctor Varona and Guido Messina, as well as Francisco Bass, Giulia Guerrini, Thaís Rippel, Luan Brum, Fernando Monzo, Juan Monzo, Agustín Pardella, Mariel Percossi, Byron Barbieri, Martín Tecchi and Débora Nishimoto.

The first season of eleven episodes was released on 16 February 2022. The show was renewed for a second season, which was released on 30 December 2022.

Plot 
A series that combines action, mystery, romance and endearing musical moments, which tells the story of a group of teenagers who work to save an old hotel lost in the middle of the Argentine Delta. Cielo Grande brings together childhood memories, family secrets and unforgettable moments in the middle of an exciting wakeboarding competition.

Cast

Main 
Pilar Pascual as Stefania "Steffi" Navarro
Abril Di Yorio as Luz Aguilar
Víctor Varona as Antonio "Tony"
Guido Messina as Julián
Francisco Bass as Ron Navarro Lavalle
Giulia Guerrini as Natasha Rossi 
Thaís Rippel as Natalia "Naty" (season 1)
Luan Brum as Carlos "Charlie" Santos
Fernando Monzo as himself 
Juan Monzo as himself 
Agustín Pardella as Noda (season 1)
Mariel Percossi as Matrix (season 1; guest season 2) & Wonder (season 2) 
Byron Barbieri as Ian Navarro (season 1; recurring season 2)
Martín Tecchi as Augusto Montero
Débora Nishimoto as Irene (season 1)
Jimena La Torre as Cynthia Aguilar (season 2; recurring season 1)
Pasquale Di Nuzzo as Oliver (season 2)
Carlos Contreras as Santiago "Santi" (season 2)
Mirta Márquez as Leonor Campos (season 2)
Cristina Alberó as Rita (season 2)

Recurring 
Juana Masse as Luz (child) (season 1)
Benjamín Otero as Julián (child) (season 1)
Juan Salinas as Ron Navarro (teenager) (season 1)
Camila Geringer as Cynthia Aguilar (teenager) (season 1)
Denise Cotton as Dra. Visero (season 1)
Bárbara Pérez as herself (season 2)

Episodes
<onlyinclude>

Season 1 (2022)

Season 2 (2022)

Notes

References

External links
 

Spanish-language Netflix original programming
Musical television series
2020s Argentine television series
2020s music television series
Television series about teenagers